Aly Maher Pasha (9 November 1882 – 25 August 1960) was an Egyptian political figure. 

He was minister of finance from 1928 to 1929. He served as Prime Minister of Egypt from 30 January 1936 to 9 May 1936, a second term from 18 August 1939 to 28 June 1940, a third term from 27 January 1952 to 2 March 1952 and a final fourth term from 23 July 1952 to 7 September 1952. His final term ended when he was forced to resign for his opposition to the Egyptian land reform initiated by the Revolutionary Command Council during the Egyptian Revolution of 1952.

References

External links
 

1882 births
1960 deaths
19th-century Egyptian people
20th-century prime ministers of Egypt
Prime Ministers of Egypt
Finance Ministers of Egypt
Foreign ministers of Egypt
Egyptian pashas